Lana Watson (born 1 October 1976 in Brandon, Manitoba) is a Canadian-English curler.

At the national level, she is a six-time English mixed champion and is a 2015 English mixed doubles champion curler.

She curled while growing up in Manitoba and even was on a women’s team with Brandonite Lois Fowler and three-time national champion Cathy Gauthier. She moved to England in 2002 to get a master’s degree in actuarial science and has stayed there since graduating to work as an actuary.

Teams

Women's curling

Mixed curling

Mixed doubles

References

External links 

Living people
1976 births
English female curlers
English curling champions
Canadian expatriate sportspeople in England
Curlers from Manitoba
Sportspeople from Brandon, Manitoba
Canadian emigrants to England